Newland is an unincorporated community in northeast Pettis County, in the U.S. state of Missouri. The community is on Missouri Route EE approximately eight miles northeast of Sedalia.

A post office called Newland was established in 1892, and remained in operation until 1902. The community has the name of Judge William Henry Newland, a pioneer citizen.

References

Unincorporated communities in Pettis County, Missouri
Unincorporated communities in Missouri